Tommy Walsh is a Carlow Gaelic footballer, who has also played with Wicklow. He plays for the Fenagh club. He also played hurling with Carlow.

Career
Walsh won the Tommy Murphy Cup with Wicklow in 2007. There were then rumours about a possible return to Carlow under new manager Paul Bealin. Tommy then played with Wicklow against Dublin in the O'Byrne Cup and had confirmed that he would remain with Mick O'Dwyer. However, his return to Carlow was announced in April 2010 to face his former Wiclow colleagues in 16 May's Leinster Senior Football Championship opener.

Personal life
Tommy is the brother of Carlow footballer Patrick Walsh.

References

Year of birth missing (living people)
Living people
Dual players
Carlow inter-county Gaelic footballers
Carlow hurlers
Fenagh Gaelic footballers
Wicklow inter-county Gaelic footballers
Bray Emmets Gaelic footballers